Giacomo Frantoni  (born 18 March 1991 in Zevio) is an Italian national champion BMX cyclist.

Personal life
He was born in Zevio. His first coaches were Ludivic Laurent and his mother Linda Spiazzi, who represented Italy in downhill mountain biking at the world championships in the 1990s.

Career
He was selected in the Italian team for the Cycling at the 2020 Summer Olympics – Men's BMX racing. He went into the Games as a double Italian national champion.

References

External links
 
 
 
 

1991 births
Living people
BMX riders
Italian male cyclists
Olympic cyclists of Italy
Cyclists at the 2020 Summer Olympics
Cyclists from the Province of Verona